"Now I've Found You" is a song by Sean Maguire, released as a single in 1995. It was the first single from his second album Spirit which was released a year later.  "Now I've Found You" reached number 22 and spent three weeks in the UK Singles Chart.

Track listing

CD1
"Now I've Found You"
"Once In A Lifetime"
"Now I've Found You" (Extended Mix)
"Now I've Found You" (Republica Mix)

CD2
"Now I've Found You"
"Lead Me By The Hand"
"Now I've Found You" (Extended Mix)
"Now I've Found You" (Republica Dub)

References 

1995 singles
Sean Maguire songs
1995 songs
Parlophone singles